The 2021 Vitality Roses Reunited Series was a three-match series, contested between England and Jamaica from 28 November to 5 December 2021. England won the series after winning the first two matches, and Jamaica won the final match.

Background
England and Jamaica last played each other during the 2020 Netball Nations Cup; Jamaica won that match. Jamaica had planned to tour England in January 2021, though that series was postponed due to travel restrictions relating to the COVID-19 pandemic. It was the first time since the 2020 Netball Nations Cup that England played a match at home with spectators.

Prior to the series, England played a warm up match against an England A team, and Jamaica played two warm up fixtures against England A. The first match of the Vitality Roses Reunited Series was held at the Copper Box Arena in London, and the remaining two fixtures were at the Motorpoint Arena Nottingham.

Squads

Matches

First Test
After two quarters of the match, Jamaica led England 26–25. England took the lead in the third quarter and maintained it throughout, eventually winning by 10 points.

Second Test
England had the lead throughout, leading 21–13 after the first quarter and 35–19 at half-time. England eventually won 66–47. It was the first time since 2013 that England had won a series against Jamaica.

Third Test
At half time, Jamaica were leading 32–24. The third quarter was drawn, and Jamaica won the fourth quarter, eventually winning 63–53.

References

2021 in English netball
International netball competitions hosted by England
England national netball team series
November 2021 sports events in the United Kingdom
December 2021 sports events in the United Kingdom
2021 sports events in London